Takatsu, alternatively spelled Gao Jin in Chinese, refers to:

People:
Shingo Takatsu
Gao Jin

Places:
Takatsu-ku, Kawasaki
Takatsu Station (disambiguation)
Takatsu Station (Kanagawa)
Takatsu Station (Kyoto)